Crooklands is a village in South Lakeland, Cumbria, England,  south of Kendal on the A65 road. Historically part of Westmorland, the Lancaster Canal and Peasey Beck pass through Crooklands. The adjacent showfield of the Westmorland County Agricultural Society is the venue of the annual Westmorland County Show (first held 1799,  moved to this site late 20th century), Country Fest (since 2009) and various other events.

Crooklands is a ward which elects one councillor to South Lakeland district council. The population of this ward at the 2011 census was 2,146.

In the 1870s Crooklands was described as "a hamlet in Preston-Richard township, Heversham parish". Preston Richard is now a separate parish from Heversham.

See also

Listed buildings in Preston Richard

References

Villages in Cumbria
South Lakeland District